The Adolphus was a wooden brigantine that was wrecked on the rocks west of Pier Head  at Wollongong harbour in New South Wales on 29 November 1866. The ship was carrying coal from Wollongong to Sydney under the command of Captain William Kean. There were no casualties, but the vessel was lost.

Further reading
Online Database's
Australian National Shipwreck Database
Australian Shipping - Arrivals and Departures 1788–1968 including shipwrecks 
Encyclopedia of Australian Shipwrecks - New South Wales Shipwrecks 

Books
Wrecks on the New South Wales Coast. By Loney, J. K. (Jack Kenneth), 1925–1995 Oceans Enterprises. 1993 .
Australian Shipwrecks - vol1 1622-1850, Charles Bateson, AH and AW Reed, Sydney, 1972, Call number 910.4530994 BAT
Australian shipwrecks Vol. 2 1851–1871 By Loney, J. K. (Jack Kenneth), 1925–1995. Sydney. Reed, 1980 910.4530994 LON
Australian shipwrecks Vol. 3 1871–1900 By Loney, J. K. (Jack Kenneth), 1925–1995. Geelong Vic: List Publishing, 1982 910.4530994 LON
Australian shipwrecks Vol. 4 1901–1986 By Loney, J. K. (Jack Kenneth),  1925–1995. Portarlington Vic. Marine History Publications, 1987 910.4530994 LON
Australian shipwrecks Vol. 5 Update 1986 By Loney, J. K. (Jack Kenneth),  1925–1995. Portarlington Vic. Marine History Publications, 1991 910.4530994 LON

References

External links

Shipwrecks of the Illawarra Region
Ships built in New Brunswick
1852 ships
Maritime incidents in November 1866
1851–1870 ships of Australia
Merchant ships of Australia
Brigantines of Australia